Hendrio Araújo da Silva (born 16 May 1994) is a Brazilian footballer who plays as a winger for Malaysia Super League club Terengganu.

Career

At the age of 12, Hendrio joined the youth academy of Barcelona, one of Spain's most successful clubs.

In 2013, he signed for Atlético Onubense in the Spanish fourth division.

Before the second half of 2014/15, he signed for Georgian side Sioni.

In 2017, Hendrio signed for Paços de Ferreira in the Portuguese top flight after playing for Portuguese fourth division team Varzim B, where he made 6 appearances and scored 0 goals.

In 2018, he returned to Atlético Onubense in the Spanish lower leagues.

Before the second half of 2018/19, Hendrio signed for Portuguese third division outfit Fafe.

Before the second half of 2019/20, he signed for Moralo in the Spanish fourth division.

Before the 2021 season, he signed for Vietnamese side Binh Dinh.

Before the 2023 season, he signed for Vietnamese side Nam Dinh FC.

Achievements

Club
	Topenland Bình Định
V.League 1:
 Third place: 2022
Vietnamese National Cup:
 Runners-up: 2022

References

External links
 
 Hendrio at playmakerstats.com (English version of ogol.com.br)
 

Brazilian footballers
Expatriate footballers in Vietnam
Brazilian expatriate sportspeople in Portugal
Expatriate footballers in Portugal
Brazilian expatriate sportspeople in Georgia (country)
Brazilian expatriate sportspeople in Vietnam
Brazilian expatriate footballers
Living people
1994 births
Association football wingers
Expatriate footballers in Georgia (country)
V.League 1 players
Segunda División B players
Tercera División players
Primeira Liga players
Liga Portugal 2 players
Atlético Onubense players
Campeonato de Portugal (league) players
Erovnuli Liga players
F.C. Paços de Ferreira players
FC Sioni Bolnisi players
AD Fafe players
Moralo CP players
CD Don Benito players